Tony Jones (12 November 1937 – 1990) was an English footballer who played for Oxford United, Newport County and Witney Town. During his spell at Oxford, he played 319 league games, and he is eleventh highest in the overall list of appearances. Jones is also third in the all-time goalscoring list.

References

External links
Rage Online profile

1937 births
1990 deaths
English footballers
Association football defenders
Oxford United F.C. players
Newport County A.F.C. players
Cheltenham Town F.C. players
English Football League players
Association football midfielders